Jörg Syrlin the Elder (c. 1425 in Ulm – 1491 in Ulm) was a German sculptor who is considered part of the Ulm school. After his death his son Jörg Syrlin the Younger took over command of his workshop. His best known works are the carvings for the choir stalls of the Ulm Minster.

Further reading 
 Anja Schneckenburger-Broschek. "Syrlin." In Grove Art Online. Oxford Art Online, (accessed January 1, 2012; subscription required).
 
 Ludger Alscher, Günter Feist and Peter H. Feist (ed.): Lexikon der Kunst, Architektur, Bildende Kunst, Angewandte Kunst, Industriegestaltung, Kunsttheorie. vol. IV, Verlag Das europäische Buch, West Berlin 1984
 Franz Härle: Das Chorgestühl im Ulmer Münster. Geschichte des Glaubens in Eiche geschnitzt. Langenau 2000, 
 Wolfgang Lipp: Begleiter durch das Ulmer Münster. Langenau 1999, 
 Eduard Mauch: Georg Sürlin, Vater, und Georg Sürlin, Sohn, Bildner in Stein und Holz. In: Württembergischer Bildersaal. Vol I. Schaber, Stuttgart 1859, pp. 75–77 (Digitalized)
 Barbara Schäuffelen und Joachim Feist: Ulm - Porträt einer Stadtlandschaft. Konrad Theiss Verlag, Stuttgart 1987, 
 Wilhelm Vöge: Jörg Syrlin der Ältere und seine Bildwerke, Bd. II: Stoffkreis und Gestaltung. Verlag Dt. Verein f. Kunstwiss., Berlin 1950, no ISBN
 Gerhard Weilandt, "War der ältere Sürlin Bildhauer?" Jahrbuch der Staatlichen Kunstsammlungen in Baden-Württemberg 28 (1991), pp. 37–54.
 Gerhard Weilandt. "Ein archivalischer Neufund zur Fassung des Hochaltarretabels im Ulmer Münster." Ulm und Oberschwaben 49 (1994), pp. 51–60.
 Gerhard Weilandt, "Der wiedergefundene Vertrag Jörg Syrlins des Älteren über das Hochaltarretabel des Ulmer Münsters. Zum Erscheinungsbild des frühesten holzsichtigen Retabels." Zeitschrift für Kunstgeschichte 59 (1996), pp. 437–460.
 Michel Erhart und Jörg Syrlin d.Ä. Spätgotik in Ulm. Exhibit catalog, Ulmer Museum, Ulm 2002.

External links 
 
 Entry for Jörg Syrlin the Elder on the Union List of Artist Names

15th-century German sculptors
German male sculptors
People from Ulm
1491 deaths
1420s births